Aldi Henry (born July 17, 1972) is a former professional Canadian football player who played defensive back for the Calgary Stampeders of the Canadian Football League from 1997 to 2002. He was part of the Stampeders 1998 and 2001 Grey Cup winning teams. He won the Dick Suderman Trophy as the 89th Grey Cup's Most Valuable Canadian. He played college football at Michigan State University.

References

1972 births
Living people
Calgary Stampeders players
Michigan State Spartans football players
Players of Canadian football from Quebec
Canadian football people from Montreal
Canadian football defensive backs